Welford  may refer to:

Places
Australia
Welford National Park

England
Welford, Berkshire
RAF Welford
Welford Park
Welford, Northamptonshire
Welford Reservoir
Welford Road Stadium
Welford-on-Avon, Warwickshire

Other uses
Welford (surname)

See also 
Wellford (disambiguation)